Live at AVO Session Basel is a video by English rock band Jethro Tull, released in 2009. It shows footage of the concert released in Basel by the band in 2008 at Avo Session Basel indoor music festival.

Track listing 
 My Sunday Feeling
 Living in the Past
 Serenade to a Cuckoo (Instrumental)
 So Much Trouble
 Nursie
 Rocks on the Road
 A New Day Yesterday
 Too Old to Rock 'n' Roll: Too Young to Die
 Bourée (Instrumental)
 Nothing Is Easy
 Dharma for One (Instrumental) (Drum solo)
 Heavy Horses
 Thick as a Brick (excerpt)
 Aqualung
 Locomotive Breath

Personnel
 Ian Anderson – vocals, flute, guitar
 Martin Barre – electric guitar
 John O'Hara – keyboard
 David Goodier – bass guitar
 Doane Perry – drums

See also 
 Living with the Past

External links 
 Official Jethro Tull website

Jethro Tull (band) video albums
Progressive rock video albums
Live video albums
Jethro Tull (band) live albums
2009 video albums
2009 live albums